Crotalaria strigulosa is a species of plant in the family Fabaceae. It is found only in Yemen.

References

strigulosa
Endemic flora of Socotra
Least concern plants
Taxonomy articles created by Polbot
Taxa named by Isaac Bayley Balfour